Rising for the Moon is the tenth studio album by the British folk rock band Fairport Convention, released in 1975. It reached number 52 in the UK albums charts. This was the last Fairport album to feature vocalist Sandy Denny.

Historical perspective

During this period, the band was dubbed by some fans—in a tongue-in-cheek manner—as "Fotheringay Convention" and "Fotheringport Confusion", as the core of Fotheringay (Denny, her husband Trevor Lucas, and Jerry Donahue) joined the remaining members of the early 1970s version of Fairport (Dave Pegg, Dave Mattacks and Dave Swarbrick) for this version of the band. Lucas, an Australian, and Donahue, an American, joined Pegg, Swarbrick, and drummer Mattacks in 1973 for the recording of the album Rosie. Denny travelled with the band while they toured in 1974 and began performing with them on stage.

This was the first Fairport Convention album not to involve John Wood in the production, and the only one not to feature any traditional material. With a number of solid songs penned, they entered the studio for recording sessions. Although still firmly rooted in the folk-rock vein, producer Glyn Johns brought a more polished and pop-influenced sound to the recording. Mattacks left midway through the sessions and was replaced by drummer Bruce Rowland.

This was the last Fairport record to reach the UK charts prior to Red & Gold in 1989; it entered the chart on 12 July 1975, and stayed just one week, reaching no. 52. The band (especially Denny) pinned their hopes on Rising For The Moon to finally be their breakthrough album; that level of popularity never materialized and, in December 1975, after touring in support of the album, Donahue left the band, followed shortly by Denny and Lucas. Carrying on as Fairport Convention, Pegg, Swarbrick and Rowland recruited several short-term replacements before persuading founder member Simon Nicol to return.

Track listing

Bonus reissue tracks
 "Tears" (Lucas) – 4:09
 "Rising for the Moon" (Denny) – 3:06
 "Stranger to Himself" (Denny) – 2:17
 "One More Chance" (Denny) – 3:46

Personnel
Fairport Convention
Sandy Denny – vocals, piano (1, 10), electric piano (3, 6, 9)
Trevor Lucas – vocals, rhythm guitar (1-8, 10-11)
Dave Swarbrick – vocals, violin (1-3, 7-8, 10-11), viola (3, 9), mandolin (3), dulcimer (5), autoharp (3), acoustic guitar (6, 9)
Jerry Donahue – lead guitar
Dave Pegg – bass, electric guitar (8), backing vocals (1-2, 7-8, 10)
Dave Mattacks – drums (1-3, 8, 11)
Bruce Rowland – drums (4-7, 9-10)

Notes

References

1975 albums
Island Records albums
Fairport Convention albums
Sandy Denny albums
Albums produced by Glyn Johns
Albums recorded at Olympic Sound Studios